Álvaro Borges Vieira Pinto (11 November 1909 in Campos dos Goytacazes – 11 June 1987 in Rio de Janeiro) was a Brazilian intellectual, philosopher and translator. He is well known for his nationalism and his defense of the autonomous development of Brazil. His research addressed education, medicine, mathematics, demography, physics, technology and others. The educator Paulo Freire called him mestre brasileiro, 'the Brazilian teacher'. His philosophy centered on the concept of 'work', which he understood to be an essential aspect of the human being.

Works 

 Ideologia e desenvolvimento nacional (1956)
 Consciência e realidade nacional [2 volumes] (1960-1961)
 A questão da universidade (1961)
 Por que os ricos não fazem greve? (1962)
 Ciência e existência: problemas filosóficos da pesquisa científica (1969)
 El pensamiento crítico en demografia [español] (1973)
 Sete lições sobre educação de adultos (1982)
 O conceito de tecnologia [2 volumes] (2005)
 A sociologia dos países subdesenvolvidos (2008)

See also 

 Underdevelopment

External links 

 Studies of Álvaro Vieira Pinto
 Bibliography

1909 births
1987 deaths
20th-century Brazilian philosophers
People from Campos dos Goytacazes
Philosophers of technology